Pseudoyuconia is a genus of fungi in the family Pleosporaceae. This is a monotypic genus, containing the single species Pseudoyuconia thalictri.

References

Pleosporaceae
Monotypic Dothideomycetes genera